Black Mafia Life is the second studio album by American hip hop group Above the Law. This album is what would be considered the blueprint of the G-Funk sound similar to Dr Dre's The Chronic. The album was recorded in 1991 into 1992 but was held back due to legal issues with Epic And Dr. Dre's Departure from Ruthless Records. It was released on February 2, 1993, via Ruthless Records. The album peaked at number 6 on the Top R&B/Hip-Hop Albums and number 37 on the US Billboard 200. Rolling Stone gave the album 4.5 stars of 5.

As on the group's previous works, Livin' Like Hustlers and Vocally Pimpin', this album's audio production was mostly handled by A.T.L. themselves, but this one excluded any contributions from Lay Law. It featured guest appearances from Kokane, Eazy-E, 2Pac, MC Ren, and Money-B. Its lead single "V.S.O.P." peaked at number 9 on the Hot Rap Singles and number 97 on the Hot R&B/Hip-Hop Singles & Tracks.

Above the Law member Go Mack left the group after release of this album.

Track listing
All tracks produced by Above The Law

Notes
Track 2 contents elements from "(Not Just) Knee Deep" by Funkadelic (1979) and "Eulogy and Light" by Funkadelic (1970)
Track 3 contents elements from "Can Move You (If You Let Me)" by Parliament (1974), "Atomic Dog" by George Clinton (1982) and "Back to Life (Club Mix)" by Soul II Soul (1989)
Track 4 contents elements from "Synthetic Substitution" by Melvin Bliss (1973)
Track 5 contents elements from "Introducing The Players" by Ohio Players (1975)
Track 6 contents elements from "Freak Of The Week" by Funkadelic (1979) and "4 The Funk Of It" by Above The Law (1991)
Track 7 contents elements from "Colour Me Funky" by Parliament (1979), "Bring The Noise" by Public Enemy (1987), "Wino & Junkie" by Richard Pryor (1974), "Scenario (Remix)" by A Tribe Called Quest & Leaders of the New School (1992) and "Let's Have Some Fun" by Bar-Kays (1977)
Track 8 contents elements from "On The Floor" by Fatback Band (1982)
Track 9 contents elements from "Fat Cat" by Bootsy Collins (1980), "Mothership Connection (Star Child)" by Parliament (1975), "Good Old Music" by Funkadelic (1970), "Heaven And Hell Is On Earth" by 20th Century Steel Band (1975) and "Niggers Are Scared Of Revolution" by The Last Poets (1970)
Track 10 contents elements from "I Can't Go for That (No Can Do)" by Hall & Oates (1981), "Backstrokin'" by Fatback Band (1980), "Cutie Pie" by One Way (1982), "Genius of Love" by Tom Tom Club (1981) and "The Bertha Butt Boogie" by The Jimmy Castor Bunch (1974)
Track 11 contents elements from "Do the Funky Penguin (Part 2)" by Rufus Thomas (1971), "Atomic Dog (Extended Version)" by George Clinton (1982), "You're a Customer" by EPMD (1988) and "Another Execution" by Above the Law (1990)
Track 12 contents elements from "Bon Bon Vie (Gimme the Good Life)" by T.S. Monk (1980)
Track 13 contents elements from "Housequake" by Prince (1987) and "Keep on Movin'" by Soul II Soul (1989)
Track 14 contents elements from "Heartbeat" by Taana Gardner (1981) and "Gigolo" by Fatback Band (1981)

Personnel

 Gregory Fernan Hutchinson — producer, scratches, keyboards, mixing
 Kevin Michael Gulley — co-producer, scratches
 Arthur Lee Goodman III — co-producer, scratches
 Anthony Stewart — co-producer, scratches
 Eric Wright — guest vocals (track 8), executive producer
 Jerry Long, Jr. — guest vocals (tracks 2, 8, 13)
 Tupac Shakur — guest vocals (track 6)
 Ronald Brooks — guest vocals (track 6)
 Lorenzo Patterson — guest vocals (track 11)
 Brian Gardner — mastering
 Donovan Smith — mixing
 Mark Paladino — mixing
 Michael Sims — guitar
 B-Laid Back Edwards — keyboards
 David Elliot — scratches
 D.J. Sno — scratches
 Poet H.B. — scratches (track 10)
 Mary Ann Dibs — art direction, design
 Julio Estrada — photography
 Mark Machado — artwork
 Digital Underground — backing vocals
 Tha Pimp Clinic — backing vocals
 Tha New Funkateers — backing vocals

Chart positions
Billboard Music Charts album
Billboard 200 (#37)
Top R&B/Hip-Hop Albums (#6)
Billboard Music Charts singles
"V.S.O.P." (Hot Rap Singles) (#9)
"V.S.O.P." (Hot R&B/Hip-Hop Singles & Tracks) (#97)

References

1993 albums
G-funk albums
Ruthless Records albums
Above the Law (group) albums
Albums produced by Cold 187um